This is a comprehensive list of awards and nominations won by Tiësto, a Dutch DJ.

Tiësto was the first DJ to hold DJ Magazine's "No. 1. DJ in the World" title for the three consecutive years: in 2002, 2003 and 2004. Other honours include countless national and international best DJ awards, being named Officer of the "Order of Orange-Nassau" by the Dutch Royalty, and being voted by the Dutch people as their 40th greatest citizen of all time. In 2007, he was awarded with the national Dutch prize of the Golden Harp.

In February 2015, Tiësto was awarded a Grammy Award in the Best Remixed Recording, Non Classical category for his remix of John Legend's "All Of Me". This is Tiësto's first Grammy Award and second Grammy Nomination, following 2008's inclusion in the Best Electronic/Dance Album category, for Elements of Life.

DJ Mag Top 100 DJ Ranking

Grammy Awards

|-
| 2008 
| Elements of Life 
| Best Dance/Electronica Album 
| 
|-
| 2015 
| "All of Me (Tiesto's Birthday Treatment Remix)" (John Legend)
| Best Remixed Recording, Non-Classical 
| 
|-
| 2022 
| The Business 
| Best Dance/Electronic Recording 
|

Titles
 2003 40th greatest Dutch citizen of all time
 2003 Officer of the Order of Orange-Nassau
 2006 International Dance4Life Ambassador
 2008 Beatport Music Awards: 2nd Best Trance Artist
 2009 Mixmag's #1 DJ of 2008
 2009 Beatport Music Awards: 2nd Best Trance Artist
 2010 Beatport Music Awards: 2nd Best Trance Artist
 2010 Trance Top1000: Best Song of All Time (Delirium - Silence (DJ Tiësto In Search Of Sunrise Remix))
 2011 Mixmag: The Best DJ of All Time
2017 Honorary citizen of his hometown Breda

Awards
 1999 Gold Sales Award (Gouryella)
 2000 Gold Sales Award (Walhalla)
 2002 Zilveren Harp Music Award
 2002 Lucky Strike Dance Award
 2002 Dutch Popprijs
 2002 Ibiza DJ Award: Best International DJ Trance
 2002 DJ Magazine: No1 DJ
 2003 World Dancestar Award U.S.A.: Best International DJ
 2003 ID&T Dutch DJ Award: Best Dutch DJ by professional jury
 2003 ID&T Dutch DJ Award: Best Dutch DJ by audience
 2003 Radio 538 Dance Award: Radio 538 Dutch Audience Edison
 2003 TMF Award Holland: Best Dance Act National
 2003 TMF Award Holland: Best National DJ
 2003 TMF Award Belgium: Best Dance International
 2003 MTV Europe Music Awards: Best Dutch Act
 2003 BG Magazine Award: Best Club/Trance/Hardhouse DJ
 2003 Mixmag Award: Best Resident Ibiza
 2003 DJ Magazine: No1 DJ
 2004 ID&T Dutch DJ Award: Best Dutch DJ by audience
 2004 Buma/Stemra Sound of Silence Award
 2004 TMF Award Belgium: Best International DJ
 2004 World Music Award: World's best selling Dutch artist
 2004 Ibiza DJ Award: Best International DJ Trance
 2004 TMF Award Holland: Best National DJ
 2004 TMF Award Holland: Best Dance Act National
 2004 WMC Awards Miami: Best International DJ
 2004 DJUK awards: best DJ
 2004 DJ Magazine: No1 DJ
 2005 3 FM Award: Best Dance Artist
 2005 Release Dance Award: Best Trance/Progressive artist
 2005 Release Dance Award: Best International DJ
 2005 TMF Belgium: Best International DJ
 2005 Dance Music Award Germany: Best Trance Artist
 2005 WMC Awards Miami: Best Producer
 2005 WMC Awards Miami: Best Hi-NRG / Euro track
 2005 WMC Awards Miami: The Ortofon Best European DJ 2004
 2005 WMC Awards Miami: Best Producer 2004
 2005 TMF Award Holland: Best Dance National
 2005 TMF Award Holland: Radio 538 single of the year
 2005 TMF Award Holland: Lifetime Achievement
 2005 Edison Music Award: Best dance album – Just Be
 2006 TMF Awards Belgium: Award for Lifetime achievement
 2006 TMF Awards Belgium: Best Dance
 2006 TMF Awards Belgium: Best remixer
 2006 3 FM Awards: Best Dance Artist
 2006 Canadian Golden Award (Tiësto in Concert 2 DVD)
 2007 WMC Awards Miami: Best Progressive House/Trance Track (Dance4Life)
 2007 WMC Awards Miami: Best Ortofon Global DJ 2006
 2007 WMC Awards Miami: Best Full Length DJ Mix CD (In Search of Sunrise 5: Los Angeles)
 2007 Radio 3FM Awards: Best Dance artist
 2008 BUMA golden harp award 2007
 2008 Dutch BUMA export award
 2008 WMC Awards Miami: Best Global DJ
 2008 WMC Awards Miami: Best Full Length DJ Mix CD (In Search of Sunrise 6: Ibiza)
 2008 Ibiza DJ Award: Best International DJ
 2008 IDMA Award Best Global DJ / Best Electronic Dance Album - Elements Of Life
 2008 Best International DJ at the DJ Awards
 2009 Best Global DJ:(Idma) ANNUAL INTERNATIONAL DANCE MUSIC AWARDS
 2009 Best Full Length DJ Mix:(Idma) ANNUAL INTERNATIONAL DANCE MUSIC AWARDS (In Search of Sunrise 7: Asia - Tiësto)
 2009 Best Podcast:(Idma) ANNUAL INTERNATIONAL DANCE MUSIC AWARDS (Radio 538: Tiësto's Club Life Podcast)
 2009 Best Artist (Solo):(Idma) ANNUAL INTERNATIONAL DANCE MUSIC AWARDS

Nominations
 2002 Dance Award by the UK's Muzik Magazine in the category Best Radio 1 Essential Mix
 2002 Best Progressive DJ at the DJ Awards
 2004 Best Trance DJ at the DJ Awards
 2005 Best Trance DJ at the DJ Awards
 2006 Best Trance DJ at the DJ Awards
 2007 Best Dutch & Belgian Act at the MTV Europe Music Awards 2007
 2007 Best Dance at the TMF Awards
 2008 WMC Awards Miami: Best European DJ
 2008 WMC Awards Miami: Best Producer
 2008 Beatport Music Awards: Best Trance Artist
 2008 World Music Award: Best DJ
 2008 Best Trance DJ at the DJ Awards
 2009 WMC Awards Miami: Best Progressive House/Trance Track (Imagination (Tiësto Remix))
 2009 WMC Awards Miami: Best European DJ
 2009 Beatport Music Awards: Best Trance Artist

Notes

References

Tiësto
Tiesto